Hoek is a Dutch surname. It may have a patronymic origin, as Hoek was a West Frisian form of the name Hugo. It can also be a shortened form of names like Van den Hoek ("from the corner").  People with the surname include:

Evert Hoek (born 1933), South African-Canadian geotechnical engineer 
Frans Hoek (born 1956), Dutch football goalkeeper and coach
 (1878–1951), German pioneering ski mountaineer, namesake of the Hoek Glacier
Martin Hoek (1834–1873), Dutch astronomer and experimental physicist
Milan Hoek (born 1991), Dutch football defender
 (1851–1914), Dutch ichthyologist
Sylvia Hoeks (born 1983), Dutch film and television actress
Hoeck
Horst Hoeck (1904–1969), German Olympic rower
Johann Hoeck (1499–1553), German Lutheran theologian known as "Johannes Aepinus"
Karl Hoeck (1794–1877), German classical historian and philologist

See also
Van den Hoek, incl. "Van Hoek" and "Van der Hoek"

References

Dutch-language surnames